The jazz album The Toshiko–Mariano Quartet featuring Toshiko Akiyoshi (then Toshiko Mariano) on piano and Charlie Mariano on alto saxophone was recorded in New York in 1960 and released on the Candid label.  This Candid recording is not to be confused with the similarly titled Toshiko–Mariano Quartet (1963), a recording of mostly Leonard Bernstein songs from the musical West Side Story, released on the Takt (Nippon Columbia) label.

Track listing
LP side A
"When You Meet Her" (Mariano) – 6:24
"Little T" (Mariano) – 13:14
LP side B
"Toshiko's Elegy" (Akiyoshi, Mariano) –  8:42
"Deep River" (traditional) – 5:35
"Long Yellow Road" (Akiyoshi, Mariano) – 7:11

Personnel
Toshiko Akiyoshi – piano
Charlie Mariano – alto saxophone
Eddie Marshall – drums
Gene Cherico – bass

References / external links
[ Allmusic]
Candid CS-9012, Candid CM-8012

Specific

Toshiko Akiyoshi albums
Charlie Mariano albums
1961 albums
Candid Records albums